Petrophile macrostachya is a species of flowering plant in the family Proteaceae and is endemic to southwestern Western Australia. It is an erect shrub with prickly, pinnate or lobed leaves, and oblong or cylindrical heads of glabrous yellow to cream-coloured flowers.

Description

Taxonomy
Petrophile macrostachya was first formally described in 1830 by Robert Brown in the Supplementum to his Prodromus Florae Novae Hollandiae et Insulae Van Diemen from material collected by Charles Fraser near the Swan River in 1827. The specific epithet (macrostachya) means "long flower spike".

Distribution and habitat
Petrophile macrostachya grows in heath, shrubland and woodland from the Kalbarri National Park to near Gingin in the Avon Wheatbelt, Geraldton Sandplains, Jarrah Forest and Swan Coastal Plain biogeographic regions.

Conservation status
This petrophile is classified as "not threatened" by the Western Australian Government Department of Parks and Wildlife.

References

macrostachys
Eudicots of Western Australia
Proteales of Australia
Taxa named by Robert Brown (botanist, born 1773)
Plants described in 1830